Group C of the 2003 FIFA Women's World Cup was one of four groups of nations, consisting of Argentina, Canada, Germany and Japan. It began on September 20 and its last matches were played on September 27. Most matches were played at the Columbus Crew Stadium in Columbus. Germany won every match, while Argentina failed to win a match. Despite beating Argentina 6–0, Japan failed to advance, while a young Canada team surprisingly made the second round.

Standings

Matches
All times local EDT/UTC−4)

Germany vs Canada

Japan vs Argentina

Germany vs Japan

Canada vs Argentina

Canada vs Japan

Argentina vs Germany

References

External links
2003 FIFA Women's World Cup Group C

Group
2002–03 in Argentine football
Group
Group
2003 in Japanese women's football